Thomasleeha or St. Thomas is a 1975 Indian Malayalam-language historical drama film based on the life of St. Thomas the Apostle and his missionary work in India. It was directed and produced by P. A. Thomas.

Plot
The film tells the story of St. Thomas the Apostle who reached the Malabar Coast in AD 52 to spread the Gospel among the Jews and locals who are today known as Saint Thomas Christians or Nasranis. He eventually established the Ezharappallikal or Seven and Half Churches in Kerala. These churches are at Kodungallur, Palayoor, Kottakkavu (Paravur), Kokkamangalam, Niranam, Nilackal (Chayal), Kollam and Thiruvithamcode (half church). He became a martyr in AD 72, at St. Thomas Mount near Mylapore, Chennai.

Cast 
 
Mohan Sharma as St. Thomas 
Thikkurissy Sukumaran Nair 
T. R. Omana 
Prathapachandran 
Unnimary 
Bahadoor 
Kanakadurga 
Murali  
T. G. Ravi 
Umesh Chandran 
Ushakumari 
Vidhubala

Soundtrack 
The music was composed by Salil Chowdhary and Sebastian Joseph.

References

External links
  
 

Indian biographical films
History of Kerala on film
1975 films
1970s Malayalam-language films
Indian historical drama films
1970s historical drama films
Films scored by Salil Chowdhury
Thomas the Apostle
Films about Christianity
1975 drama films
Films based on the Bible
Films based on the New Testament
Films based on the Gospels
Films set in Palestine (region)
Films set in Jerusalem
Films set in ancient Egypt
Films set in the Roman Empire
Film portrayals of Jesus' death and resurrection
Films about the Nativity of Jesus
Depictions of Herod the Great on film
Portrayals of Jesus in film
Portrayals of the Virgin Mary in film
The Devil in film
Cultural depictions of Herod the Great
Cultural depictions of Judas Iscariot
Cultural depictions of John the Baptist
Cultural depictions of the Biblical Magi
Cultural depictions of Paul the Apostle
Cultural depictions of Saint Peter
Cultural depictions of Pontius Pilate
Portrayals of Mary Magdalene in film
Portrayals of Saint Joseph in film
Christian mass media in India